Merritt Moore (born February 24, 1988) is an American ballerina and quantum physicist. She studied at both the University of Oxford and Harvard University. Moore works to combine her interests in physics and ballet through her research and dedication in both the arts and sciences. She is completing her residency at Harvard University's ArtLab where her work combines science and dance through the use of robots. Moore has a Bachelor's Degree in Physics from Harvard University and a PhD in Atomic and Laser Physics from the University of Oxford. Merritt Moore has danced professionally for many ballet companies across the world including English National Ballet and Norwegian National Ballet. She has performed in Swan Lake and The Nutcracker among other ballets.

Moore was featured as one of the contestants on BBC's 'Astronauts: Do You Have What It Takes?' in 2017. Moore has been featured in Good Night Stories for Rebel Girls 2", published by Rebel Girls and written by Francesca Cavallo and Elena Favilli, 'Forbes 30 Under 30', and Glamour Magazine's 'Top Ten College Women' competition. Moore spoke at TEDxOxbridge in 2013 and performed a ballet duet with dance partner Adam Kirkham. Moore started SASters - a group that encourages women to pursue their dreams in the arts and sciences.

Early life 
Merritt Moore was born in Los Angeles, California on February 24, 1988, to Alice Chu-Hoon Moore and Schuyler Moore. Her mother is Korean and her father is American. Her father worked as an entertainment attorney; Moore also has a sister. Gymnastics was the first sport Moore was involved in growing up. Later, Moore discovered a love for mathematics and dance. She took her first dance class at the age of 13 after her mother persuaded her to do so. Moore spent her Junior year of high school abroad in Viterbo, Italy.

Higher education 

Merritt Moore attended Harvard University and majored in physics. She began attending Harvard in 2006 and knew she wanted to major in physics after taking it in high school and finding an interest in it. While at Harvard, she won the Michael von Clemm Fellowship, an exchange program between Harvard and Oxford open to seniors. In 2011, she graduated magna cum laude from Harvard with a bachelor's degree in physics. After graduating from Harvard, Moore attended the University of Oxford from 2012 - 2017 where she earned her PhD in Atomic and Laser Physics. She continued to dance ballet professionally throughout her time at both universities. While at Harvard, she took a yearlong break from her studies to pursue ballet with Zurich Ballet, the largest ballet company in Switzerland.

Residency 
Merritt Moore is completing her residency through a program run by Harvard University's ArtLab. She's working with the ArtLab, a Harvard run lab that's open to all Harvard students. She talks about her residency in an article published on the ArtLab's website - a subset of Harvard University's main site. She discusses the project she's currently working on in the ArtLab residency program. She will be working with robots and dance and arranging a dance between a human and a robot. This study will involve the visual arts including film and ballet. They will use a UR10e robotic arm which is a robotic arm that helps assist with certain tasks. She will collaborate with Alice Williamson who lives in London, England and is a performer and artist. Alice Williamson has worked with the visual arts and led research while working on this residency. According to her biographical statement concerning Moore's residency which is published on the ArtLab's main website, it states, "Merritt and collaborator Alice Williamson will explore how Artificial Intelligence can inspire and broaden human creativity through the language of dance" ("Merritt Moore").

Career 
Merritt Moore’s career has crossed disciplines. Her quantum mechanics research has focused on the topic of quantum computing. Her career in ballet has allowed her to perform in ballets across the world. Her current residency at Harvard's ArtLab combines ballet and science. Her performances at Harvard's ArtLab are focused on showing her relationship with science and also on teaching science through the performance. Moore has studied physics at Harvard University and the University of Oxford. Her ballet career has brought her to perform with many well known companies like Zurich Ballet and Boston Ballet.

Quantum mechanics 
Physics has been a large part of Merritt Moore's life. She took her first physics class in high school. As Moore put it, "I gravitated towards physics because I found a freedom in the math and was inspired by the mysteries of the universe" (Newnham). She has worked in physics at both Harvard and the University of Oxford, earning her PhD at the University of Oxford and her Bachelor's with honors from Harvard in Physics.

Atomic and laser physics 
Moore earned her PhD in Atomic and Laser Physics from the University of Oxford. Atomic and Laser Physics involves the study of matter and light in various environments.

Research 
Merritt Moore’s work in academia has focused on quantum computing. On both works she has contributed to, she is listed as a coauthor. The first work, published in 2013 during her time at Oxford, is about using a system of qubits and CPHASE gates to try to create a more efficient quantum computing system. The second paper, published in 2016, was about a system of quantum computing that combines quantum computing with classical computing done on a separate server. In this paper, researchers tested whether or not measurements of light could be used to securely carry information between the servers.

Ballet 
Moore began dancing at thirteen years of age. When she was fifteen, she traveled to Viterbo, Italy. While in Italy, Moore met Irina Rosca who had been a dancer at the National Ballet of Romania. Moore trained with Rosca during her time in Italy. When Moore started at Harvard, she joined the student-run dance group and was taught technique by Damian Woetzel and Heather Watts. During her sophomore year at Harvard in 2008, Moore was accepted at Zurich Ballet. After dancing with Zurich Ballet, she danced in Cambridge for a while before joining Boston Ballet. Merritt has starred in La Bayadère and The Nutcracker at Boston Ballet. After graduating from Harvard, Moore performed Swan Lake and The Nutcracker with the English National Ballet. She also performed with robots with London Contemporary Ballet Theater. Moore practiced George Balanchine’s Symphony in C at the Norwegian National Ballet company.

Performances 

 La Bayadère
 The Nutcracker
 Swan Lake

Ballet companies 
Merritt Moore has performed with many ballet theaters including:

 Boston Ballet - a professional ballet company in Boston, Massachusetts.
 Zurich Ballet - a ballet company in Switzerland.
 English National Ballet - a ballet company in London, England.
 Norwegian National Ballet - the first professional ballet company in Norway.
 London Contemporary Ballet Theatre - a contemporary dance school in London, England.

SASters 
Merritt Moore started SASters which stands for Science-Art-Sisters. The purpose of SASters is to help younger girls to find an interest in STEM. In addition, SASters is focused on teaching girls to incorporate both science and art into their lives. The group aims to bring together those pursuing science and art careers. SASters has an Instagram page @sasters_squad and a website.

Public appearances 
Merritt Moore’s career as a science educator led her to speak at TEDxOxbridge and star on the television show Astronauts: Do You Have What It Takes?. She has performed ballet at unconventional venues like the Victoria and Albert Museum. Moore spoke at the Forbes Women's Summit, a 'Women in STEM' panel, and for the Princeton Physics Department. She also created a virtual reality experience at the Barbican Theater in London in collaboration with Darren Johnson.

Astronauts: Do You Have What It Takes? 
Merritt Moore starred on BBC as a contestant on their program Astronauts: Do You Have What It Takes. She had wanted to be an astronaut since she was young. She used to identify constellations at night with her father. While at a dinner, her friend mentioned the show was accepting applications. Merritt immediately applied and was accepted as one of twelve applicants. Astronauts: Do You Have What It Takes tested the applicants through various forms - both physically and mentally - to see who would be a good candidate to become an astronaut.

TEDxOxbridge 

Merritt Moore was invited in 2013 to TEDxOxbridge. Moore talks about how she felt when she started to dance and how her perspective on dance has changed after working with quantum optics in the lab. She then performed a duet with partner Adam Kirkham. TEDx is an organization that is self-organized and attempts to mimic an actual TED event.

Victoria and Albert Museum 
Moore performed a dance with robots at the Victoria and Albert Museum in London, England.

Barbican Theater 
Moore collaborated with Darren Johnston and used Virtual Reality to create an exhibit involving meditation. The finished exhibit now runs at the Barbican Theater in London, England. It uses the concept of zero point energy which says that energy is everywhere, even where we least expect it to be.

Forbes Women's Summit 
Moore was invited to speak in New York at the Forbes Women's Summit in New York.

'Women in STEM' Panel 
In March 2019, Moore spoke at the US Embassy in London for a 'Women in STEM' panel. The panel was discussing the importance of having more women involved in fields of STEM.

Imagine Film Festival 
Moore was invited to the Imagine Film Festival in NY in 2017. She worked with Inés Vogelfang to create a film they called 'Duality'.

Princeton Physics Department 
Moore was invited to speak at the Princeton Physics Department in 2019. She talked about her journey in ballet and physics and how the two relate.

Recognition 
Merritt Moore has been featured in many published works including Good Night Stories for Rebel Girls 2', 'Top Ten College Women', and Forbes 30 Under 30.

Good Night Stories for Rebel Girls 
Merritt Moore has her own story about her life and achievements in Good Night Stories for Rebel Girls 2, from publisher Rebel Girls, written by Francesca Cavallo and Elena Favilli. The book documents 100 women who have done something incredible in their lives. It is the sequel to 'Good Night Stories for Rebel Girls' - also by Francesca Cavallo and Elena Favilli.

Top Ten College Women 
Glamour Magazine featured Merritt Moore has one of their 'Top Ten College Women' competition. Moore was 22 when she received this honor.

Forbes 30 Under 30 
Merritt Moore was featured in Forbes 30 Under 30 in 2018 when she was 29 years old. Forbes 30 Under 30 recognizes people under thirty years of age that the publication deems remarkable individuals.

References 

Harvard School of Engineering and Applied Sciences alumni
Alumni of the University of Oxford
1988 births
Living people
American women physicists
Women in optics